Seeds of Peace is a peacebuilding and leadership development organization headquartered in New York City. It was founded in 1993. As its main program, the organization brings youth and educators from areas of conflict to its camp in Maine. It also provides local programming to support Seeds of Peace graduates, known as Seeds, once they return home. Its mission is to empower youth from conflict regions to work for a better future.

History

Seeds of Peace began in 1993 as an idea of the American journalist John Wallach. At a state dinner with politicians from Israel, Egypt, and the Palestinian Authority, Wallach toasted them, then inspired them to pledge to bring 15 youngsters from each of their respective countries to a new camp he was founding in Maine. These 46, including 3 Americans, ranging in age from 13 to 18, comprised the first session of the Seeds of Peace Camp, founded on the site of the former Camp Powhatan in Otisfield, Maine.

The campers from 1993 were later present at the signing ceremony of the Declaration of Principles (better known as the Oslo Accords) in Washington, D.C. President Bill Clinton, Israeli Prime Minister Yitzhak Rabin, Israeli Foreign Minister Shimon Peres, and PLO Chairman Yasir Arafat were photographed holding Seeds of Peace T-shirts.

From its start in 1993 through 2010, Seeds says that over 4,000 children have attended the camp. Children have attended from a wide variety of countries, with Seeds offices in Amman, Cairo, Gaza, Jerusalem, Kabul, Lahore, Mumbai, Otisfield, Ramallah, and Tel Aviv as of 2010.

Campers

Selection process
The selection takes about half a year, with most of the participants being 14–16 years old. Typically, applicants to Seeds of Peace apply through the school systems in their home countries. Applicants must demonstrate proficiency in English, leadership skills, and local politics. They are selected on the basis of interviews and written essays. Many of the first-time campers are chosen by the Ministries of Education or other government agencies in their respective countries.

Organization
John Wallach's vision focused on leaders of the next generation—on Seeds who will one day be in positions of power. In the first years of the camp, it became clear that to realize this vision the organization needed the support of people in the regions of conflict in positions of power now. This needs to establish legitimacy on the ground at home inspired the creation of the Delegation Leaders Program. Delegation Leaders are educators from the countries in conflict; they take part in the selection and orientation of Seeds at home. They accompany the Seeds to and from camp. At the camp, they are the eyes and ears of the parents, of their communities; at the same time, they engage in an intense encounter experience of their own. After camp, they are invited to join the growing circles of support for Seeds of Peace.

These many years of conflict resolution programming have produced an impressive cadre of Seeds working in international affairs, politics, business, medicine, nonprofit, and media.

While at camp, participants speak English, the common language of the camp, to open the lines of communication between national and ethnic groups.

Camp is the potential beginning of a long process, of relationships that grow. The adjustment to life at home after camp can be difficult, especially when the political conditions are less than encouraging. To aid in this transition, the organization supports returning Seeds with year-round programming, including dialogue sessions, cross-cultural visits, educational and leadership development workshops, and outreach events. These activities work to sustain the relationships and ideals developed in the International Camp, supporting the Seeds' lifelong commitments to sustaining and promoting dialogue and understanding in their home regions.

In 2001, Seeds of Peace expanded to South Asia. Seeds in this region are active leaders through various programs that bring together conflicting sides from Afghanistan, India and Pakistan.

Asel Asleh

On October 2, 2000, Asel Asleh, an Israeli Arab and graduate of the program, was killed by Israeli security forces during a demonstration. He was wearing the Seeds of Peace T-shirt at the time of the shooting and was subsequently buried in it.

Leadership
John Wallach, the founder of the organization, also served as its president until his death in 2002. He was succeeded by former State Department official Aaron David Miller, who left the job early in 2006. Later, Janet Wallach, wife of John Wallach, was named president emeritus and Steven Flanders served for a time as the executive officer in charge. Starting in the spring of 2007, Nicolla Hewitt served briefly as President, until her departure in 2008. Leslie Adelson Lewin served as director from the fall of 2009 to 2019. In 2020, the organization announced Fr. Josh Thomas as its new Executive Director.

Offices
The organization's U.S. headquarters is located in New York City. Seeds of Peace has also opened central offices in Jerusalem and smaller offices in Amman, Cairo, Gaza, Kabul, Lahore, Mumbai, Otisfield, Ramallah, and Tel Aviv as of 2010. With the support of Seeds of Peace staff, and growing networks of older "Seeds," Delegation Leaders and parents, the young graduates of the Camp continue activities across borders and within their own communities. Programs for older Seeds—people in their 20s—are expanding as the organization meets the needs of Seeds moving through new phases of life.

The Olive Branch
From 1996–2012, the organization's graduates published a magazine, The Olive Branch, that summed up their activities over a period of several months. It included reports, poetry, essays, and photos.

Life after camp

Approximately 350 new Seeds graduate from Seeds of Peace every summer.  After camp, the organization runs year-round regional programs for graduates in their home countries that focus on "four of the most important assets and abilities that leaders in conflict regions need to create meaningful change: strong relationships across lines of conflict; a sophisticated understanding of core conflict issues; practical skills in communication, critical thinking, and change-making; and the ability to take action on behalf of peace." Author John Wallach himself dedicated his book "The Enemy Has a Face: The Seeds of Peace Experience" to the organization.

Regional Programs 
These events are organized by the regional branches of Seeds of Peace and students who have attended the Seeds of Peace Maine Camp ("Seeds") take an active role in the same.

Criticism
Seeds of Peace has been criticized by some for its perceived contriving of a false equivalence between the actions of the Israelis and those of the Palestinians by omitting the larger historical context of the conflict, and for not being sufficiently critical of Israeli policies toward the Palestinians.

In a fantasy-theme analysis of Seeds of Peace publications, Engstrom (2007) argues that organizations like Seeds of Peace unknowingly participate in sustaining the conflicts they seek to eliminate. This is done by a promoted rhetoric of deferred peace that places the burden of ending the conflict on future generations. Politicians and other stakeholders in the current conflict use their support for Seeds of Peace as a signal of their commitment to peace while remaining committed to military engagement in the present. By continuously promoting peace as something that exists in the future, politicians can maintain the status quo and undermine the power of institutions working for peace today.

See also
 Alliance for Middle East Peace
 Arava Institute for Environmental Studies
 Combatants for Peace
 Hand in Hand: Center for Jewish-Arab Education in Israel
 MEET - Middle East Education through Technology
 Neve Shalom – Wāħat as-Salām
 OneVoice Movement
 The Parents Circle-Families Forum

References

Sources
 Seeds of Peace official website
 For 130 Arab and Israeli Teenagers, Maine Camp Is Where Peace Begins New York Times, 3 September 1995
 In Search of Peace On Common Ground New York Times, 29 August 1999
 Mideast teens plant Seeds of Peace CNN.com, 14 August 2001
 Seeds of Peace camp plants seed of hope CNN.com, 19 July 2002
 Arabs, Israelis Hold Peace Reunion Fox News, 16 August 2005
 Peace Camp's Sense of Hope Unshaken Washington Post, 7 August 2006

External links
 
Omer Goldman Shministim and Daughter of Deputy Director of Mossad Official Israeli Students who refuse to enlist in the IDF Website:"People who use violence are wrong!" - www.omergoldman.com (In English with video and radio interviews including kidnapping/torture of Palestinian children and IDF)

 
Non-governmental organizations involved in the Israeli–Palestinian peace process
Israeli–Palestinian peace process
Organizations established in 1993
Summer camps in Maine
Peace camps
Otisfield, Maine
Jews and Judaism in Maine